Hadecha is a village in Chitalwana  Tehsil in Chitalwana  sub-division in Jalore district of Indian state of Rajasthan. Hadecha is about 15 km from SanchoreHadecha is an important town in Sanchore Tehsil.  

The Most Common Caste found here are Choudhary(Patel),Jain & Rabari. 

There is one Huge Jain Temple. Locals Call it "GURU MANDIR"   - "Kanak Bhuvan Kirtistambh " Samadhi Sthal of Acharya Kanakprabha Suriswarji Ms and Acharya Bhuvanshekhar Suriswarji MS and Its the Main Attraction of Village. From Its Top Almost Whole Village is visible. 
Hadecha is Nirvaan Bhoomi of Acharya Kanakprabha Suriswarji and Acharya Bhuvanshekhar Suriswarji
Kirti Stambha is 108 Feet in height and 9 Floors  - The Biggest Kirti Stambha Jain temple has been completed in Hadecha Nagar of Jalore Dist of Rajasthan. 
Its height is 108 feet! 9 Storey Made of Sangmarmar White Marble Sri Kanak-Bhuvan Kirtistambh
KanakKirtiBhuvanAbhinandan 
Pran Pratistha (Opened ) On 3-2-2023 (Vikram Samvat 2071 Maha Sudi Teras) 

There is one Ramdev Baba Temple at Outskirt of Village and a Pink Lake Nearby that Temple. 

There is One Shiva and Hanuman Temple in Main Street of Village. 

Few more Jain Temples. In the middle of village most of houses are of jain people. 

Village has many small lakes. 

Hadecha celebrated 100 years of the first Jain Temple in January 2007. Hadecha is now called as a Tirth (most holy place of worship) under Jain religion is being built in the memories of Acharya Shri Kanak Prabhusuriswarji.
 
There is Baba Ramdevji Hindu temple on the Hadecha road near Sanchore.

References

Villages in Jalore district